Antonio P. Santos Sr. (April 10, 1920 – February 7, 1988), better known as Tony Santos Sr., was a Filipino film and television actor and director. He is known for his work as lead actor in Badjao and Anak Dalita, as well as for the roles he played in Sakada and Sister Stella L. He also appeared on the long-running TV series Flordeluna.

He has won best supporting actor awards from the Filipino Academy of Movie Arts and Sciences, the Philippine Movie Press Club, and the Manunuri ng Pelikulang Pilipino. He is one of Behn Cervantes' favorite Filipino actors.

Personal life
Santos Sr. was married to non-showbiz wife with their children: Mer T. Santos (Jan. 13, 1940-April 15, 2007), Maximo T. Santos Sr. (May 11, 1946-Aug. 13, 2021), and Antonio "Tony" Santos Jr. (Dec. 14, 1940-Oct. 8, 2009).

Selected filmography

Death
Santos Sr. died on February 7, 1988, of an undisclosed cause; he was 67. He was buried in Manila North Cemetery in Sta. Ana, City of Manila.

References 

1920 births
1988 deaths
Filipino male film actors
Filipino male television actors
Filipino television directors
Filipino film directors